VivaCité is a Belgian public service radio station operated by RTBF. The station launched on 29 February 2004 from the merger of regional network Fréquence Wallonie and Brussels station Bruxelles Capitale. VivaCité is the French-language equivalent of VRT Radio 2.

Overview
VivaCité is a radio network, covering the French-speaking regions of Belgium, via six regional stations (Brussels, Charleroi, Hainaut, Liège, Namur/Luxembourg/Walloon Brabant). Its programming is a mix of adult contemporary music with personality-driven shows and sports coverage in the evenings. All six stations air local programming in the morning between 5:30 and 8:30 weekdays, with evening drive coming from four locations (Luxembourg and Charleroi air neighbouring stations' shows).

Radiolène, a station based in Verviers was absorbed into the VivaCité network. Radiolène was created in 1982 as an experimental local station. It was severely reduced in 2004 by the Magellan Plan re-organisation of public radio, then closed as an independent station with three morning opt-out news bulletins remaining as local output.

Slogans
 2004: La nouvelle radio
 2004-2006: On a plein de choses à se dire
 2006: Au cœur de vos émotions
 2007-2009: En toute complicité
 2009: La radio complice
 2009: Et la vie va!
 2011: Ma radio complicité

Reception

FM

VivaCité Brabant wallon
 Wavre: 97.3

VivaCité Bruxelles
 Brussels: 99.3

VivaCité Liège
 Liège: 90.5
 Malmedy: 91.6
 Spa: 94.6
 Verviers: 103.0
 Welkenraedt: 89.4

VivaCité Charleroi	
 Charleroi: 92.3
 Chimay: 95.4

VivaCité Hainaut	
 La Louvière: 99.5
 Mons: 97.1
 Hainaut: 101.8

VivaCité Namur
 Couvin: 94.2
 Namur (centre): 89.1
 Namur (province): 98.3

VivaCité Luxembourg
 Ardennes and Luxembourg: 91.5
 Bouillon: 98.1
 Houffalize: 91.8
 La Roche-en-Ardenne: 88.2
 Marche-en-Famenne: 95.2

AM

DAB+
Since the end of 2018, each local stations are available on DAB+ on their provincial block.

Until 2018, VivaCité was broadcast on DAB Block 12B (225.648 kHz). These were programmes that are broadcast by VivaCité Bruxelles which covers all of the French Community of Belgium.

Satellite
 Astra 19.2°E - 12343.50 H (encrypted) Audio: 137

Digital terrestrial television
 UHF channel 56, 66 and 45

Internet
 Listen to VivaCité

See also
 Classic 21
 La Première
 Musiq'3
 Pure
 RTBF International

References

External links

 RTBF
 VivaCité
 VivaCité Bruxelles streaming
 VivaCité Liège streaming
 VivaCité Namur - Brabant Wallon streaming
 VivaCité Hainaut streaming
 VivaCité Charleroi streaming
 VivaCité Luxembourg streaming
 VivaCité Radiolène streaming

2004 establishments in Belgium
French-language radio stations in Belgium
Mass media in Brussels
Radio stations established in 2004